The canton of Avignon-Nord  is a French former administrative division in the department of Vaucluse and region Provence-Alpes-Côte d'Azur. It had 35,229 inhabitants (2012). It was disbanded following the French canton reorganisation which came into effect in March 2015.

Composition
The communes in the canton of Avignon-Nord: 
 Avignon (partly)
 Le Pontet

References

Avignon-Nord
Avignon
2015 disestablishments in France
States and territories disestablished in 2015